Magno Santos de Almeida or simply Magno (born December 30, 1987 in Vila Velha), is a Brazilian defensive midfielder. He currently plays for Vilavelhense Futebol Clube.

Career 
Made professional debut at Botafogo in 2-1 home win over São Caetano in the Campeonato Brasileiro on October 22, 2006. On 16 April 2009 Vasco Da Gama have signed the midfielder from Gremio Esportivo Brasil (aka Brasil de Pelotas), formerly has played on loan for America-RJ, Macaé Esporte Futebol Clube (RJ) and Metropolitano-SC.

References

External links
sambafoot.com
CBF
canalbotafogo.com

1987 births
Living people
Brazilian footballers
Botafogo de Futebol e Regatas players
America Football Club (RJ) players
Association football midfielders